Brodosana is a village in the south of Kosovo,  located the Opolje region of the Šar Mountains.

Notes

References 

Villages in Dragash